This is a list of companies headquartered or formerly headquartered in San Diego, California.

Companies headquartered in San Diego

 ApparelBad Boy
Cool-jams
Reef sandals
Tribal GearBiotechnologyAbgent
Acadia Pharmaceuticals
Accelrys / Biovia (acquired by Dassault Systems)
Allerca
Amylin Pharmaceuticals
Apricus Biosciences
Arena Pharmaceuticals
Cytori Therapeutics
Genesee Scientific
Genomics Institute of the Novartis Research Foundation
Halozyme Therapeutics
Hologic
Illumina
Integrated Genetics
InvivoGen
La Jolla Institute for Immunology
Neurocrine Biosciences
NuVasive
Quidel Corporation
ResMed
Salk Institute for Biological Studies
Sequenom
Sanford-Burnham Medical Research Institute
The Scripps Research InstituteComputer softwareAbacus Data Systems
Aonix
AstroPrint
Axure
BackBone (acquired by Quest Software)
Classy
DivX
ESET, NA
FutureWave (acquired by Macromedia)
Mitchell International
Peregrine Systems (acquired by Hewlett-Packard)
Semantic Research
Silicon Beach (acquired by Aldus)
SweetLabs
Tealium
TeradataConsumer goodsDr. Bronner's Magic Soaps
ProFlowers (acquired by Liberty Media)
WD-40 CompanyDefense contractingCubic
General Atomics
Kratos Defense & Security SolutionsEducationBridgepoint EducationElectronicsAmerican Technology Corporation
Chassis Plans
Mad Catz, Inc. (defunct)EnergyMaxwell Technologies
MobileOne
San Diego Gas & Electric
Sempra Energy
Solar TurbinesEntertainmentDaybreak Game Company
Nautilus Entertainment DesignFinance and insuranceCalifornia Bank & Trust
Commonwealth Financial Network
Encore Capital Group
LPL Financial
California Coast Credit Union
Midland Credit Management, Inc.Food and drinkAleSmith Brewing
Ballast Point Brewing Company (acquired by Constellation Brands)
Bumble Bee Foods
Burger Lounge
Green Flash Brewing Company
Hash House a go go
Jack in the Box
Karl Strauss Brewing
Pat & Oscar's
Rubio's Fresh Mexican Grill (acquired by Mill Road Capital)
Souplantation (defunct)
Stone BrewingHealthCareFusion (acquired by Becton Dickinson)
Dexcom
Rock My World, Inc.
Scripps Health
Sharp HealthCare
Westmont Living, Inc.InternetMindTouch
Miva Merchant
Satellite Internet
SwoopThat.com
Tealium
VeohMediaKSDY-LD
McKinnon Broadcasting
Mission Times Courier
One America News Network
San Diego Business Journal
San Diego City Beat
San Diego Jewish Journal
San Diego Magazine
San Diego Reader
San Diego Union-Tribune (acquired by Tribune Publishing)
Times of San DiegoRetailLe Travel Store (closed)
Mor Furniture
PETCO
PriceSmartSportsBikeBandit
BMC USA
Competitor Group, Inc.
Ellsworth Handcrafted Bicycles
Sector 9TechnologyComma.ai
Psyonix
Workiz
Zesty.ioTelecommunicationsContinuous Computing
Cricket Communications (acquired by AT&T)
Jump Mobile (defunct)
Leap Wireless (acquired by AT&T)
Nokia UMT
Qualcomm
Skyriver
SMS.ac, Inc.
Metric Systems CorporationTransportation and logisticsNational Steel and Shipbuilding
Ryan Aeronautical
Cubic Transportation SystemsOtherThe Allen Group
Anacomp
Champion Ballroom Academy
Kyocera
OliverMcMillan
Peregrine Semiconductor
Quality Assurance International
Realty Income Corporation
PCS Prostaff Inc
Hire-Payroll

Companies headquartered in San Diego County
Notable companies and corporations headquartered outside San Diego, but within San Diego County include:ApparelAtticus Clothing
Fallen Footwear
Nixon (company)
Vuori ClothingBiotechnologyIsis Pharmaceuticals
TimeLogicCommunicationsViaSat, IncConsumer goodsNatural Alternatives InternationalElectronicsHitachi Data Systems
NTN Buzztime
Pulse~LinkFood and drinkCoco's Bakery
Daphne's Greek Cafe
Islands Fine Burgers & Drinks
Stone BrewingMusical instrumentsCarvin Corporation
Taylor Guitars
Deering Banjo CompanySports equipmentCallaway Golf
Cobra Golf
TaylorMade Golf
VolleyHut.comTelecommunicationsViasat, Inc.Transportation and logisticsAdvanced Aircraft
SpaceDev, IncOther'''
CineForm
Hunter Industries
Jenny Craig, Inc
Rockstar San Diego
Upper Deck Company

References

External links
Top companies in the San Diego metro area on the 2012 Inc. 5000

 
 
companies